Catania is an Italian surname. Notable people with the surname include:
A. Charles Catania (born 1936), American psychologist
Antonio Catania (born 1952), Italian actor
David Catania (born 1968), American politician and lawyer
Dolores Catania (born 1970), American television personality and cast member of The Real Housewives of New Jersey
Emanuele Catania (born 1988), Italian long jumper
Emanuele Catania (footballer) (born 1981), Italian football player
Frank Catania (born 1941), American politician 
Giusto Catania (born 1971), Italian politician
Jim Catania (born 1954), American drummer
Kenneth C. Catania (born 1965), American neuroscientist
Léa Catania (born 1993), French synchronized swimmer
Mario Catania (born 1952), Italian minister of agriculture from 2011 to 2013
Nick Catania (born 1945), former Australian politician
Susan Catania (born 1941), American politician
Vince Catania (born 1977), Australian politician
Yuri Catania (born 1975), Italian photographer and film director

Italian-language surnames